The following table gives details of locomotives owned by the London, Brighton and South Coast Railway from its creation in July 1846 until the end of 1849. 

The locomotives acquired by the London Brighton and South Coast Railway at its creation in July 1846 came from the division of those owned previously operated by the Joint Committee of the South Eastern,  London and Croydon and  London and Brighton Railways. The division took place in 1845 but only took effect at the dissolution of the Committee in January 1846. The creation of the LB&SCR (which was an amalgamation of the London and Croydon and London and Brighton Railways), seven months later meant that the new company acquired those locomotives allocated to both companies.
The majority of the locomotives acquired had formerly been owned or ordered by one of the three constituent railways, but some had been ordered by the Joint Committee. After the dissolution of the Joint Committee, there some locomotives on ordered by John Gray, the new locomotive superintendent, from Timothy Hackworth which were delivered during 1847 and 1848, and others purchased from Stothert & Slaughter, and Stothert & Slaughter between 1847 and 1849. After this date new locomotives for the railway were built to the designs of John Chester Craven, usually at Brighton railway works (see List of Craven locomotives).

Locomotive summary

Sources

 
 

 
London, Brighton
London, Brighton and South Coast Railway
Scrapped locomotives